Dosher Memorial Hospital is a not-for-profit, public, community hospital in Southport, North Carolina. The hospital serves Smithville Township—Southport, Bald Head Island, Caswell Beach, Oak Island, and the eastern portion of St. James—and surrounding communities of Brunswick County, North Carolina. Opened on June 2, 1930 as Brunswick County Hospital, the hospital changed its name in 1939 to J. Arthur Dosher Memorial Hospital in memory of founding physician and first general surgeon, Julius Arthur Dosher, MD.

Established as a critical access hospital under Article 2 of the NC General Statue § 131-4, Dosher Memorial Hospital is overseen by a publicly elected Board of Trustees. It is the only independent critical access hospital in North Carolina. Dosher is licensed for 25 acute care beds, and focuses on outpatient surgeries and procedures. The hospital is accredited by DNV-GL Healthcare. It also owns and operates nine primary care, women's health and urgent care clinics across southern Brunswick County (source: Dosher website).

Hospital tax 

In 1976, Smithville Township voted 1,866 For and 344 Against to create a hospital tax district and to levy a 30-year tax of 4¢ per $100 assessed property valuation. The hospital took this step to maintain the acute-care hospital in southern Brunswick County in response to plans for construction of a new hospital in Supply, North Carolina. The election was challenged by opponents of the hospital, but was allowed to stand by the North Carolina Supreme Court.

In July 1978, it was revealed that another election had to be held in order to make changes in the bond issue. The people of Smithville Township were asked to vote once more, and passed a new $3.2 million bond issue by a vote of 1,790 in favor and 79 opposed.

The hospital tax expired in 2000 and the community was asked to renew the tax of 4¢ per $100 valuation for capital improvements, renovation, and new construction. The community voted in favor of the tax.

Dr. Julius Arthur Dosher 

On April 30, 1878, Julius Arthur Dosher was born to Mary Ann Pinner and Julius Dosher of Southport, NC. Dr. Dosher graduated from the Maryland College of Pharmacy in 1900 and the University of Maryland School of Medicine in 1903. He returned home from college to set up a medical practice. Later that year, he married Grace Kennard. They had one daughter, Little Grace.

In 1919 Dr. Dosher was named Acting Assistant Surgeon in the United States Public Health Service and served in Southport at the Quarantine Station, a position he held until he retired in 1937.  Located on pilings in the Cape Fear on the shore of Bay Street across from the Brunswick Inn, the Quarantine Station was a shelter used for screening sailors aboard incoming ships. Dr. Dosher and his nurse treated sick sailors and disinfected the men and their vessels.

In 1936 Dr. Dosher was elected to the American College of Physicians and Surgeons, an honor comparable to the Distinguished Service Cross in the Army.

On January 10, 1939 Dr. Dosher died at the age of 60 from complications related to pulmonary tuberculosis that he acquired in 1937.

External links 
 Official website

Hospital buildings completed in 1930
Buildings and structures in Brunswick County, North Carolina
Hospitals in North Carolina